Oncidium auricula is a species of orchid endemic to southeastern Brazil.

References

External links 

auricula
Endemic orchids of Brazil